Hagerman Peak is a summit in the Diablo Range, in Santa Clara County, California.

References 

Diablo Range
Mountains of Northern California